The following outline is provided as an overview of and topical guide to anthropology:

Anthropology – study of humanity.  Anthropology has origins in the natural sciences, the humanities, and the social sciences. The term was first used by François Péron when discussing his encounters with Tasmanian Aborigines.

What type of thing is anthropology? 
Anthropology can be described as all of the following:

 Academic discipline – body of knowledge given to – or received by – a disciple (student); a branch or sphere of knowledge, or field of study, that an individual has chosen to specialise in.
 Field of science  – widely recognized category of specialized expertise within science, and typically embodies its own terminology and nomenclature.  Such a field will usually be represented by one or more scientific journals, where peer reviewed research is published.  There are many sociology-related scientific journals.
 Social science – field of academic scholarship that explores aspects of human society.

History of anthropology 

History of anthropology

Fields of anthropology 
 Archaeology
 Biological anthropology, concerned with the biological and behavioral aspects of human beings
 Linguistic anthropology
 Cultural anthropology, focused on the study of cultural variation
 Social anthropology, the dominant constituent of anthropology throughout the United Kingdom

Archaeological and biological subfields 
Outline of archaeology

 Anthrozoological
 Biocultural
 Evolutionary, studies the relation between hominids and non-hominid primates
 Feminist, seeks to reduce male bias in research finding
 Forensic, application of anthropology in judicial settings
 Maritime
 Palaeoanthropological

Linguistics subfields
Outline of linguistics

 Linguistic anthropology, the interdisciplinary study of how language influences social life
 Descriptive
 Ethno-
 Historical
 Semiotic, an approach to semantics
 Sociolinguistics

Socio-cultural anthropology subfields
 Applied anthropology, the application of the method and theory of anthropology to the analysis and solution of practical problems
 Anthropology of art
 Cognitive anthropology, concerned with what people from different groups know and how that implicit knowledge, in the sense of what they think subconsciously, changes the way people perceive and relate to the world around them
 Communication studies
 Cultural studies
 Digital anthropology, the study of the relationship between humans and digital-era technology
 Anthropology of development
 Ecological anthropology
 Economic anthropology
 Historical anthropology
 Anthropology of gender & sexuality
 Kinship & family
 Legal anthropology
 Media anthropology
 Medical anthropology
 Political anthropology
 Psychological anthropology, studies the interaction of cultural and mental processes
 Public anthropology
 Anthropology of religion
 Transpersonal anthropology, studies the relationship between altered states of consciousness and culture
 Urban anthropology, concerned with issues of urbanization, poverty, and neoliberalism
 Visual anthropology, the study and production of ethnographic photography

Other subfields
 Anthropological criminology, a combination of the study of the human species and the study of criminals
 Anthropological linguistics, the study of the relations between language and culture and the relations between human biology, cognition and language
 Anthropological theories of value, attempts to expand on the traditional theories of value used by economists or ethicists
 Cyborg anthropology, studies the interaction between humanity and technology from an anthropological perspective
 Museum anthropology, a domain that cross-cuts anthropology's sub-fields
 Philosophical anthropology, dealing with questions of metaphysics and phenomenology of the human person
 Theological anthropology, the study of the human as it relates to God

General anthropology concepts 

 Anthropological theories of value
 Culture
 Society
 Kinship and descent
 Marriage and family
 Evolution
 Material culture
 Race and ethnicity
 Globalization and postcolonialism
 Socialization

Theories 

 Actor–network theory
 Alliance theory
 Cross-cultural studies
 Cultural materialism
 Culture theory
 Feminism
 Functionalism
 Interpretive
 Performance studies
 Political economy
 Practice theory
 Structuralism
 Post-structuralism
 Systems theory

Methods and frameworks

 Ethnography
 Ethnology
 Cross-cultural comparison
 Participant observation
 Online ethnography
 Holism
 Reflexivity
 Thick description
 Cultural relativism 
 Ethnocentrism
 Emic and etic

Anthropology organizations

 American Anthropological Association, a professional organization of scholars and practitioners in the field of anthropology
 American Association of Physical Anthropologists, based in the United States
 American Ethnological Society
 Anthropological Society of London, founded 1863
 Anthropological Society of Victoria, formed in 1934
 Anthropological Survey of India, the apex Indian organisation involved in anthropological studies and field data research
 Ardabil Anthropology Museum, a museum in Ardabil, Iran
 Australian Anthropological Society, the professional association representing anthropologists in Australia
 Center for World Indigenous Studies
 Ethnological Society of London
 Indian Anthropological Society, the representative body of the professional anthropologists in India
 Institute of Anthropology and Ethnography, Russian institute of research, specializing in ethnographic studies of cultural and physical anthropology
 Max Planck Institute for Evolutionary Anthropology, a research institute based in Leipzig
 Maxwell Museum of Anthropology, an anthropology museum located on the University of New Mexico campus
 Museum of Archaeology and Anthropology, University of Cambridge, the University's collections of local antiquities, together with archaeological and ethnographic artefacts from around the world
 National Anthropological Archives, an archive maintained by the Smithsonian Institution
 Network of Concerned Anthropologists
 N. N. Miklukho-Maklai Institute of Ethnology and Anthropology
 Princess Maha Chakri Sirindhorn Anthropology Centre, an academic institution in Thailand
 Royal Anthropological Institute of Great Britain and Ireland, a long-established anthropological organisation
 Society for Anthropological Sciences
 Society for Applied Anthropology
 Society for Medical Anthropology, an organization formed to promote study of anthropological aspects of health, illness, health care, and related topics
 South Carolina Institute of Archaeology and Anthropology, a University of South Carolina research institute
 USC Center for Visual Anthropology, a center located at the University of Southern California

Books, journals, and other literature

Bibliography of anthropology
List of anthropology journals

Anthropology scholars 

 American
 Franz Boas
 Ruth Benedict
 Margaret Mead
 Eric Wolf

 British
 Bronislaw Malinowski
 E.E. Evans-Pritchard
 Alfred Radcliffe-Brown
 Edmund Leach

 French
 Marcel Mauss
 Claude Lévi-Strauss

Anthropology lists 
 List of members of the National Academy of Sciences (Anthropology)
 List of museums with major collections in ethnography and anthropology
 List of visual anthropology films

See also 
 Anthropological Index Online (AIO)
 Intangible Cultural Heritage

Related fields
 Ethnology
 Folklore
 Outline of archaeology
 Outline of linguistics
 Philosophical anthropology – which is not part of anthropology but a subfield of philosophy
 Sociology
 Theological anthropology – which is not part of anthropology but a subfield of theology
 Periodic Table of Human Sciences / Anthropology in Tinbergen's four questions

References

External links 

 American Anthropological Association (AAA): What is Anthropology?
 National Association for the Practice of Anthropology (NAPA): The Profession of Anthropology

Anthropology
Anthropology
outline
Outlines of social sciences